Immunofixation permits the detection and typing of monoclonal antibodies or immunoglobulins in serum or urine. It is of great importance for the diagnosis and monitoring of certain blood related diseases such as myeloma.

Principle 

The method detects by precipitation: when a soluble antigen (Ag) is brought in contact with the corresponding antibody, precipitation occurs, which may be visible with the naked eye or microscope.

Immunofixation first separates antibodies in a mixture as a function of their specific electrophoretic mobility. For the purpose of identification, antisera are used that are specific for the targeted antibodies.

Specifically, immunofixation allows the detection of monoclonal antibodies representative of diseases such as myeloma or Waldenström macroglobulinemia.

Technique 
The technique consists of depositing a serum (or urine which has been previously concentrated) sample on a gel. After application of an electric current that allows the separation of proteins according to their size, antibodies specific for each type of immunoglobulin are laid upon the gel. It thus appears to be more or less narrow bands on the gel, which are at different immunoglobulins.

Immunofixation as immunoelectrophoresis, takes place in two steps:

 The first step is identical for both techniques. It consists in depositing the immunoglobulins contained in the serum or urine on a gel and then separating the immunoglobulins according to their electrophoretic mobility by making them migrate under the effect of an electric field. This migration depends on the mass and charge of the antigen. Once the immunoglobulins are separated, we can move to the next step.
 The second step is based on the technique used. Immunofixation requires electrophoresis to migrate serum proteins in replicate. Then, specific anti-immunoglobulin antisera are used to treat each replicate. For this, the antisera  are not placed in a channel, as in electrophoresis, but they are added individually to each migration lane. The presence of a monoclonal immunoglobulin results in the appearance of a narrow band after staining complex precipitates. For example, in the case of an IgG lambda, there will be a narrow band, both on the track on which was deposited anti-G and on which has been deposited with the anti-lambda.

Merits
Immunofixation tends to replace protein electrophoresis because  :
 it is faster (results within three hours) ;
 it is somewhat more sensitive. Immunofixation may reveal an immunoglobulin missed out by protein electrophoresis, especially at low concentrations (less than 1 gram/litre) ;
 it can be partially automated and can be used in more laboratories;
 it is more easily read and interpreted.

Demerits
Immunofixation is however only sensitive to immunoglobulins and is more expensive than protein electrophoresis.

See also
 Immunoelectrophoresis

References

Sources
 :fr:Immunofixation

External links
  - "Immunofixation - serum"
  - "Immunofixation - urine"

Glycoproteins
Immunologic tests